Western Australian Government Railways (WAGR ) railway system during its peak operational time in the 1930s to 1950s was a large system of over  of railway line.

Main lines

In rail administration, lines were given generic titles such as the Eastern Railway and the South Western, rather than being named after their destination.

Metropolitan - ER - Eastern Railway - Suburban
Bunbury - SWR - South Western Railway
Kalgoorlie - EGR - Eastern Goldfields Railway
Mullewa - NR - Northern Railway
Leonora - EGR - Eastern Goldfields Railway
Meekathara - NR - Northern Railway
Esperance - EGR - Eastern Goldfields Railway
Albany - GSR - Great Southern Railway

In different stages of the administration of the WAGR the groups into which the lines were placed were known by different names.

Eastern Lines

Eastern Railway - was known as Eastern Lines - started at Fremantle, and included other lines:
Fremantle - Northam
Fremantle - Jandakot - Armadale
Robbs Jetty - Naval Base
Bayswater - Belmont
Bellevue - Helena Vale
Bellevue - Mundaring - Mount Helena
Mundaring - Mundaring Weir
Clackline - Miling

Eastern Goldfields Lines

Northam - Kalgoorlie - is also known as the Eastern Goldfields line - started at Northam, and included:
East Northam - Wyalkatchem - Merredin
Amery - Kalannie
Burakin - Bonnie Rock
Wyalkatchem - Mukinbudin - Southern Cross
Coolgardie - Esperance
Kalgoorlie - Leonora
Malcolm - Laverton
Kalgoorlie - Kamballie

South Western Lines

Perth - Bunbury
Collie - Collie Cardiff
Pinjarra - Narrogin
Brunswick Junction - Narrogin
Bowelling - Wagin
Donnybrook - Katanning
Wonnerup - Nannup
Picton Junction - Northcliffe
Boyanup Junction - Flinders Bay

Southern Lines

Spencers Brook - Albany
York - Bruce Rock
Brookton - Corrigin
Narrogin - Merredin
Yilliminning - Merredin
Wagin - Newdegate
Lake Grace - Hyden
Katanning - Pingrup
Tambellup - Ongerup
Elleker - Nornalup

Northern Lines

East Northam - Mullewa
Geraldton - Wiluna
Geraldton - Ajana
Wokarina - Yuna
Walkaway - Narngulu
Cue - Big Bell
Port Hedland - Marble Bar

Names of Lines and abbreviations
Names of lines were abbreviated regularly in WAGR publications - to facilitate List of Stations and Sidings on the Western Australian Government Railways open for Traffic sections in Goods rates books.
Also at one stage every location was numbered with a code number.

 B       - Boulder Line
 B.B.    - Boyanup - Busselton - Flinders Bay
 B.C.    - Brookton - Corrigin
 B.N.    - Brunswick Junction - Collie - Narrogin
 C.C.    - Collie - Collie Cardiff
 C.E.    - Coolgarie - Esperance
 C.M.    - Clackline - Toodyay - Miling
 D.      - Denmark Branch (Elleker - Nornalup)
 D.K.    - Donnybrook - Katanning Section
 E.M.    - East Northam - Wongan Hills - Mullewa
 E.R.    - Eastern Railway (Fremantle - Northam)
 E.G.R.  - Eastern Goldfields Railway (Northam - Cunderdin - Kalgoorlie)
 F.A.    - Fremantle - Jandakot - Armadale
 G.A.    - Geraldton - Northampton - Ajana
 G.M.    - Goomalling - Merredin
 G.S.R.  - Great Southern Railway (Spencers Brook - Albany)
 K.B.R.  - Kalannie - Kulja - Bonnie Rock
 K.L.    - Kalgoorlie - Laverton - Leonora
 K.P.    - Katanning - Pingrup
 L.H.    - Lake Grace - Hyden
 M.      - Mundaring
 M.W.    - Mundaring Weir
 N.K.M.  - Narrogin - Kondinin - Merredin
 N.R.    - Northern Railway (Geraldton - Wiluna)
 N.W.M.  - Narrogin - Wickepin - Merredin
 P.P.    - Picton Junction - Pemberton - Northcliffe
 P.M.    - Port Hedland - Marble Bar
 P.N.    - Pinjarra - Dwarda - Narrogin
 S.W.R.  - South Western Railway (Perth - Bunbury)
 T.O.    - Tambellup - Ongerup
 W.L.B.  - Wagin - Newdegate
 W.      - Walkaway Branch (Narngulu - Walkaway)
 W.B.    - Wagin - Bowelling
 W.N.    - Wonnerup - Nannup
 W.Y.    - Wokarina - Yuna
 Y.B.    - York - Quirading - Bruce Rock

Branches/sections
Internal WAGR publications usually identified railway lines as Lines, rather than as Branch Lines.
Also tables and indexes of loads for locomotives created a large range of 'sections' that were either ganger related lengths, or related to gradients and conditions.

For a different way of identifying branches/routes see also Quinlan and Newland.
Ajana Branch
Boulder Branch
Brookton-Corrigin Branch
Bullfinch Branch
Bunbury to Katanning Branch
Busselton Branch
Collie to Brunswick Junction Branch
Collie to Wagin Branch
Denmark Branch
Donnybrook to Katanning Branch
Flinders Bay Branch
Northampton Branch
Hopetoun Railway
Hotham Valley Branch
Lake Brown Branch
Lake Grace Branch
Meekathara Branch
Mundaring Branch
Mundaring Weir Branch
Nannup Branch
Narembeen Branch
Narrogin to Collie Branch
Northcliffe Branch
Ongerup Branch
Pingrup Branch
Pinjarra to Boddington Branch
Port Hedland - Marble Bar Railway
Sandstone Branch
Toodyay Branch
Upper Darling Range Branch
Wiluna Branch
Yuna Branch

Isolated lines
A number of isolated lines did not connect with the main rail systems - these included the Port Hedland - Marble Bar Railway and the Hopetoun - Ravensthorpe Railway.  A number of piers were fitted with rail lines to carry goods from the ship to the mainland.

Operational centres

For most of the years that the WAGR existed as that entity, main offices, and divisional offices and buildings were all within a short range of Perth Railway Station. Rationalisation of the diverse addresses and locations occurred with the construction of the East Perth Head Office building.
Head Office - East Perth
Regional centres (current and historical)
 Narrogin
 Northam
Workshops
 Fremantle Railway Workshops
 Midland Railway Workshops
Marshalling yards - various yards have existed in the Perth Metropolitan area -
 Leighton
 Midland
 Kewdale
 South Fremantle (Robb Jetty).
Grain silos (current and historical)
 Bellevue/Midland
 Fremantle,
Kewdale

Notes

Rail transport in Western Australia
Western Australian Government Railways
Closed railway lines in Western Australia
Railway lines in Western Australia